Parinari anamensis  is a dicotyledonous plant species that was described by Henry Fletcher Hance from southern Vietnam.  It has been called Annamese burada and is now placed in the family Chrysobalanaceae, (but formerly the Rosaceae).  No subspecies are listed in the Catalogue of Life.

The Vietnamese name is cám.  The trunk has a pinkish-brown hue with soft flaking bark (see illustration).
The Khmer name is thlok ធ្លក. A classical name for Cambodia is Nakorkuk Thlok ("the land of the thlok tree").

References

 
 

Flora of Vietnam
anamensis